IFE or Ife may refer to:

 Ifẹ, an ancient Yoruba city in south-western Nigeria
 Ìfé, an upcoming Nigerian LGBT romantic film
 "Ife", a composition from Miles Davis' 1974 compilation album Big Fun
 Ifè language, a Niger–Congo language spoken by some 180,000 people in Togo and Benin
 In-flight entertainment, the entertainment available to aircraft passengers during a flight

Organizations
 Institute for Energy Technology
 Institution of Fire Engineers, a worldwide body that provides research, training, conferences and professional qualifications for firefighters
 Instituto Nacional Electoral, an autonomous, public organization responsible for organizing federal elections in Mexico
 Islamic Forum of Europe, an Islamic organisation based in the United Kingdom with affiliates in Europe
 State Railways Institution (Instituto de Ferrocarriles del Estado), a state-run organization of Venezuela that manages the railway systems of the country
 University of Finance and Economics (Mongolia) (previously Institute of Finance and Economics), one of the largest educational institutions of Mongolia